Filippo Conca (born 22 September 1998 in Lecco) is an Italian cyclist, who currently rides for UCI ProTeam .

Major results
2018
 4th Trofeo Alcide Degasperi
2019
 5th Overall Giro Ciclistico d'Italia
 7th Overall Giro della Valle d'Aosta
 9th Gran Premio Sportivi di Poggiana
2020
 5th Overall Giro Ciclistico d'Italia
 10th Trofeo Laigueglia
2021
 1st  Mountains classification Tour de la Provence

Grand Tour general classification results timeline

References

External links
 

1998 births
Living people
Italian male cyclists
Sportspeople from Lecco
Cyclists from the Province of Lecco